Heartland is the debut studio album from Australian band Real Life. The album was released in Australia in November 1983. The album peaked at number 30 on the Australian Kent Music Report and remained in the charts for 27 weeks.

At the Countdown Music and Video Awards of 1983, the album won Best Debut Album.

Reception

Tomas Mureika from AllMusic called Heartland "One of the strongest -- and most unappreciated -- albums of the new wave era" and singled out "Catch Me I'm Falling" as the best track on the album. Mureika said "The title track is a stirring, brooding anthem, worthy of U2's powerful early new wave days, complete with wailing guitar solo. "Broken Again," "Breaking Point," and "Openhearted" are built on solid pop hooks, while the album's closer "Burning Blue" is a melancholic summation of a great record."

Track listing
All songs written by David Sterry and Richard Zatorski.

Charts

References

1983 debut albums
Albums produced by Steve Hillage
Real Life (band) albums
Curb Records albums
MCA Records albums